The Orbiting Astronomical Observatory (OAO) satellites were a series of four American space observatories launched by NASA between 1966 and 1972, managed by NASA Chief of Astronomy Nancy Grace Roman. These observatories, including the first successful space telescope, provided the first high-quality observations of many objects in ultraviolet light.  Although two OAO missions were failures, the success of the other two increased awareness within the astronomical community of the benefits of space-based observations, and led to the instigation of the Hubble Space Telescope.

OAO-1
The first OAO was launched successfully on 8 April 1966, carrying instruments to detect ultraviolet, X-ray and gamma ray emission.  Before the instruments could be activated, a power failure resulted in the termination of the mission after three days.  The spacecraft was out of control, so that the solar panels could not be deployed to recharge the batteries that would supply power to the electrical and electronic equipment on board.

OAO-2

OAO-2 was launched on 7 December 1968, and carried 11 ultraviolet telescopes.  It observed successfully until January 1973, and contributed to many significant astronomical discoveries.  Among these were the discovery that comets are surrounded by enormous haloes of hydrogen, several hundred thousand kilometres across, and observations of novae which found that their UV brightness often increased during the decline in their optical brightness.

OAO-B
OAO-B carried a  ultraviolet telescope, and should have provided spectra of fainter objects than had previously been observable. The satellite was launched on 30 November 1970 with "the largest space telescope ever launched", but never made it into orbit.  The payload fairing did not separate properly during ascent and the excess weight of it prevented the Centaur stage from achieving orbital velocity. The Centaur and OAO reentered the atmosphere and broke up, destroying a $98,500,000 project.  The disaster was later traced to a flaw in a $100 explosive bolt that failed to fire.

OAO-3 (Copernicus)

OAO-3 was launched on 21 August 1972, and proved to be the most successful of the OAO missions.  It was a collaborative effort between NASA and the UK's Science Research Council (currently known as the Science and Engineering Research Council). After its launch, it was named Copernicus to mark the 500th anniversary of the birth of Nicolaus Copernicus in 1473.

The mission carried an X-ray detector built by University College London's Mullard Space Science Laboratory in addition to an 80 cm UV telescope built by Princeton University under the supervision of Lyman Spitzer. The mission also used a new inertial reference unit that was developed by the Massachusetts Institute of Technology.  

Copernicus operated until February 1981, and returned high resolution spectra of hundreds of stars along with extensive X-ray observations.  Among the significant discoveries made by Copernicus were the discovery of several long-period pulsars such as X Persei that had rotation times of many minutes instead of the more typical second or less, and confirmation that most of the hydrogen in interstellar gas clouds existed in molecular form.

Launches
OAO-1: Atlas-Agena D from Launch Complex 12, Cape Canaveral, Florida
OAO-2, OAO-B and OAO-3: Atlas-Centaur from Launch Complex 36, Cape Canaveral, Florida

In popular culture
 In the first season of the alternate history space drama show For All Mankind, a repair mission to an OAO-like satellite was the original objective of the Apollo 25 mission, with an artist's conception of OAO-1 appearing on the mission's emblem.

See also
 Timeline of artificial satellites and space probes
 Hubble Space Telescope

References

Code A.D., Houck T.E., McNall J.F., Bless R.C., Lillie C.F. (1970), Ultraviolet Photometry from the Orbiting Astronomical Observatory. I. Instrumentation and Operation, Astrophysical Journal, v. 161, p.377
Rogerson J.B., Spitzer L., Drake J.F., Dressler K., Jenkins E.B., Morton D.C. (1973), Spectrophotometric Results from the Copernicus Satellite. I. Instrumentation and Performance, Astrophysical Journal, v. 181, p. L97

External links
 OAO-1 at Gunter's Space Page
 OAO at the Internet Encyclopedia of Science
 OAO-3 Goddard Spaceflight Center
 Copernicus website

Space telescopes
Ultraviolet telescopes
1966 in spaceflight
1968 in spaceflight
1970 in spaceflight
1972 in spaceflight